= Yiwei Hou =

American electrical engineer

Yiwei Hou is an electrical engineer at the Virginia Polytechnic Institute & State University in Blacksburg, Virginia. He was named a Fellow of the Institute of Electrical and Electronics Engineers (IEEE) in 2014 for his contributions to modeling and optimization of wireless networks.
